Heidy Lisbeth Juárez Calle (born February 16, 1984) is a Peruvian lawyer and politician. She served as Minister of Women and Vulnerable Populations in the administration of Pedro Castillo between November and December 2022, replacing Claudia Dávila; she is also currently a member of the Congress of the Republic of Peru representing a district in the Piura Region. Juárez is a native of Rioja, and studied at the Antenor Orrego Private University. She was replaced as minister by Grecia Rojas Ortiz.

References

1984 births
Living people
People from San Martín Region
Peruvian women lawyers
21st-century Peruvian lawyers
21st-century women lawyers
Women's ministers of Peru
Women government ministers of Peru
21st-century Peruvian politicians
21st-century Peruvian women politicians
Members of the Congress of the Republic of Peru
Women members of the Congress of the Republic of Peru